Dorphinaxius kermadecensis is a genus of mud lobster native to the Norfolk Island, parts of New South Wales, and the Kermadec Islands of New Zealand. It is the only species in the genus Dorphinaxius.

References 

Thalassinidea
Monotypic arthropod genera